Elizeche is a surname. Notable people with the surname include:

 Gloria Elizeche, a.k.a. Tsiweyenki, (born  1951), Paraguayan indigenous leader
 Orlando Javier Elizeche (born 1987), Paraguayan long-distance runner